Joaquim Augusto Mouzinho de Albuquerque (12 November 1855 – 8 January 1902) was a Portuguese cavalry officer. He captured Gungunhana in Chaimite (1895) and was governor-general of Mozambique. He was a grandson of Luís da Silva Mouzinho de Albuquerque.

Mouzinho de Albuquerque was born in Batalha, and died in Lisbon.

Career

Having served in India during the 1880s, Mouzinho de Albuquerque was highly respected in Portuguese society of the 19th and 20th centuries. He was seen as the hope and symbol of Portuguese reaction to threats against Portuguese interests in Africa from other European empires.

He married his cousin Maria José Mascarenhas de Mendonça Gaivão (Lagoa, 23 July 1857 –Lisbon, 2 September 1950), without issue.

He was governor of Gaza Province and Mozambique until 1898 when he returned to Portugal. During his time as governor, Mouzinho served as commander of a cavalry squadron that fought Gungunhane. On 28 December 1895 Mouzinho captured Gungunhane in Chaimite without firing a gunshot.

He was the instructor of Crown Prince Luís Filipe.
 
He allegedly committed suicide at the entrance of the Jardim das Laranjeiras in Lisbon on 8 January 1902 (some sources claim he was killed).

Honours

He was depicted in a 20 Portuguese escudo note issued in the 1940s.

Memorial
The Rotunda da Boavista, also known as the Praça de Mouzinho de Albuquerque, honors the soldier.

Works
 O Exercito nas Colonias Orientais, (Military of the Eastern Colonies) Minerva Commercial, 1893. 
 Relatório sobre a prisão do Gungunhana, Lourenço Marques, Typ. Nacional, 1896. 
 A prisão do Gungunhana (Gungunhana Prison), Lourenço Marques, Typ. Nacional de Sampaio e Carvalho, 1896. 
 Campanha contra o Maguiguana nos territórios de Gaza em 1897 (Campaign Against Maguiguana in the Territories of Gaza (Mozambique) in 1897, 1897.
 Providências... desde 1 de Dezembro de 1896 até 18 de Novembro de 1897 (Providences.. Since 1 December 1896 to 18 November 1897), Lisbon, Imp. Nacional, 1898.
 Moçambique 1896-1898 (Mozambique 1896-1898), Lisbon, Manoel Gomes, 1899. 
 Entre mortos, carta inédita de Mouzinho de Albuquerque a sua Alteza o Príncipe Real D. Luis de Bragança, Lisbon, Tip. "A Editora", 1908. 
 Livro das campanhas (Books on Campaigns), Lisbon, Div. de Publicações e Bibliotecas, 1935. 
 Mouzinho de Albuquerque : a renúncia do Comissário Régio, Lourenço Marques, Minerva Central, 1953. 
 Pensamento e acção de Mouzinho em Moçambique : antologia, Lisbon, Gráf. Boa Nova, 1956.

References

Further reading
"Mouzinho de Albuquerque – História e Genealogia" ("Mouzinho de Albuquerque – History and Genealogy"), Fernando de Castro Pereira Mouzinho de Albuquerque e Cunha, Author's Edition, 1st ed., 1971, vol.I, pp. 188–200

External links
Mouzinho at Portugal: Historic Dictionary 
Mouzinho de Albuquerque at the Mário Soares Foundation
Gungunhana at Vidas Lusófonas
Maputo - Lourenço Marques
Different images of Mouzinho de Albuquerque
Mouzinho in Halls of Mozambique

1855 births
1902 deaths
People from Leiria District
Portuguese soldiers
Portuguese military personnel who committed suicide
Portuguese expatriates in Mozambique
Colonial people in Mozambique
Portuguese colonial governors and administrators
19th-century Portuguese people
Governors-General of Mozambique
Governors-General of Portuguese India
Honorary Knights Commander of the Order of St Michael and St George
19th-century Portuguese military personnel